Micrargeria is a genus of flowering plants belonging to the family Orobanchaceae.

Its native range is Tropical Africa, Madagascar, and Myanmar.

Species
Species:

Micrargeria barteri 
Micrargeria filiformis 
Micrargeria wightii

References

Orobanchaceae
Orobanchaceae genera